The Sarma or Serma is a cone-shaped metallic headdress that originated in Algiers.

The Sarma was mostly worn by Algerian women during the Ottoman period in Algeria. The Sarma is composed of two parts, the first being a truncated and hollow half-cone which is held against the head by thin scarves or bands and resting on the forehead. The second part is used to contain the hair and consists of a thin silver plate pierced with arabesque motifs.

Stephen D’Estry observed that the headdress of the Jewish women of Algiers, the Sarma, resembled a cone shape and was adorned with a transparent veil enriched with embroidery.

See also
 Bniqa
 Ghlila
 Karakou
 Djebba Fergani

References

Algerian clothing